Fort Rock is an unincorporated community in Lake County, Oregon, United States, southeast of Fort Rock State Natural Area.

History
The community of Fort Rock was named after the natural feature Fort Rock by the town's founder, Ray Nash. Fort Rock post office was established in 1908 under postmaster Josiah Thomas Rhoton. The Fort Rock Valley flourished briefly during the homestead period before World War I, but little remains in the area today. Fort Rock is one of two homestead-era communities remaining in the area, along with Silver Lake.

Community

Fort Rock had a general store that was in operation since the early 1900s. The store, which also included a gas station, closed in May 2013. As of September 2014, the Oregon Department of Environmental Quality had entered into a prospective purchaser agreement to reopen the store after performing needed underground storage tank (UST) cleanup. The store has reopened as of 2017.

Fort Rock also has a community church, a Grange hall, a restaurant and a tavern.

The Rock View Apartments burned down in 2012; the land on which the apartments was located was owned by the Fort Rock Care Center, which planned to donate it to the Fort Rock Historical Society in 2013. The senior apartments were only six years old when they burned.

Museum
Today, many of the buildings in Fort Rock are part of the Fort Rock Valley Historical Society's Fort Rock Valley Historical Homestead Museum, which is a collection of homestead-era buildings moved there from the surrounding area, starting in 1988. The museum was created by the Fort Rock Valley Historical Society to preserve historic buildings that were in danger of being razed by the Bureau of Land Management or were being vandalized in their remote locations. Buildings include a church, a log cabin, a doctor's office, a school, a land office, and several other cabins and houses.

Climate
Fort Rock has a dry-summer Mediterranean climate with cold winters and warm summers featuring colder nights due to large diurnal temperature variations. Freezing temperatures can occur at any time of the year. There are on average 260 days annually where the temperature reaches at or below freezing (8 of them in July).

References

External links
Historic photos of Fort Rock, Oregon from Salem Public Library
Photos of Fort Rock buildings at the Fort Rock Valley Historical Homestead Museum

Unincorporated communities in Lake County, Oregon
1908 establishments in Oregon
Populated places established in 1908
Unincorporated communities in Oregon